"Take Me High" is a song by British singer Cliff Richard, released as a single in November 1973. Written by Tony Cole, it is the title track from the film of the same name in which Richard also stars. It was released as a single with the B-side "Celestial Houses", written by Terry Britten, and peaked at number 27 on the UK Singles Chart.

Track listing
7": EMI / EMI 2088

 "Take Me High" – 2:45
 "Celestial Houses" – 2:46

Personnel

 Cliff Richard – vocals
 Terry Britten – guitar
 Kevin Peek – guitar
 Alan Tarney – bass guitar
 Dave MacRae – keyboards
 Trevor Spencer – drums
 Barrie Guard – percussion

Charts

References

Cliff Richard songs
1973 singles
1973 songs
Songs written by Tony Cole (musician)
EMI Records singles